Kļava is a Latvian surname. Notable people with the surname include:

 Kārlis Kļava (1907–1941), Latvian military officer and sports shooter
 Oskars Kļava (born 1983), Latvian football defender

Latvian-language surnames